Norm Parker (October 9, 1941 – January 13, 2014) was an American football coach. He was the defensive coordinator of the Iowa Hawkeyes from 1999 to 2011. 

In 2005, Parker was a finalist for the Broyles Award, given annually to the nation's top college football assistant coach. He also was a coach at Eastern Michigan, Wake Forest, Minnesota, Illinois, East Carolina, Michigan State and Vanderbilt. In 2011, he was the AFCA Assistant Coach of the Year.

He died in 2014 at the University of Iowa Hospital, aged 72.

References

1941 births
2014 deaths
East Carolina Pirates football coaches
Eastern Michigan Eagles football coaches
Eastern Michigan Eagles football players
Illinois Fighting Illini football coaches
Iowa Hawkeyes football coaches
Michigan State Spartans football coaches
Minnesota Golden Gophers football coaches
Vanderbilt Commodores football coaches
Wake Forest Demon Deacons football coaches
People from Hazel Park, Michigan
Educators from Michigan